Phil Lyman is a resident of Blanding, Utah who currently represents district 73 in the Utah House of Representatives. District 73 includes the counties of San Juan, Kane, Garfield, Wayne, Beaver, Piute, and part of Sevier.

During the 2022 legislative session, Lyman served on the Natural Resources, Agriculture, and Environmental Quality Appropriations Subcommittee; House Government Operations Committee; House Natural Resources, Agriculture, and Environment Committee; and Legislative Water Development Commission.

Life and professional career
By profession, Lyman is a Certified Public Accountant and has been active in the business community in Blanding and the surrounding region. He earned a B.S. in Accounting from Brigham Young University as well as a M.S. in Accounting from the University of Utah. He is married to Jody Shumway Lyman and they have five children. Lyman is a member of the American Institute of Certified Public Accountants and has worked as an AICPA Personal Financial Specialist. Serving as the San Juan County Commissioner from 2011 to 2018, Lyman was voted Commissioner of the year by Utah Association of Counties. Lyman has served as Charter President of the Rotary Club of Blanding, Utah.

Political career
As a San Juan County Commissioner, Lyman served as chairman of the board of commissioners, as chairman of the Seven County Infrastructure Coalition, as a member of the Pension Finance and Inter-governmental Relations Committee and Native American Relations Subcommittee in NACO (the National Association of Counties). While commissioner he helped to establish the San Juan County Public Health Department which brought services to the Southeast Corner of Utah and especially to the Navajos living on the Utah portion of the Utah Navajo Reservation. Lyman has been described as a firebrand in the State Legislature where he replaced another notable firebrand Mike Noel in 2019. In 2014 Lyman led a protest in Recapture Canyon, the site of native American cliff dwellings. Lyman contended that driving on county road D5314 was not a trespass and that politically motivated environmental groups were manipulating the Bureau of Land Management. He was charged and convicted of misdemeanor trespassing, for which he served ten days in jail and paid restitution of $96,000. Robert Shelby, the federal judge who presided over Lyman's trial, was forced to recuse himself and was removed from the case because of his close ties to environmental groups which he failed to disclose. After recusal by three other federal judges, Lyman's motion for a new trial was rejected by federal Judge David Nuffer, who then presided over sentencing. On December 22, 2020, Lyman was pardoned by President Donald Trump, though by accepting this pardon he admitted guilt to the offenses of which he was charged.

2022 sponsored legislation

References

External links
Lyman's business web site

Republican Party members of the Utah House of Representatives
Living people
Year of birth missing (living people)
21st-century American politicians
Recipients of American presidential pardons